John Charles McQuaid, C.S.Sp. (28 July 1895 – 7 April 1973), was the Catholic Primate of Ireland and Archbishop of Dublin between December 1940 and January 1972. He was known for the unusual amount of influence he had over successive governments.

Early life and education
John Charles McQuaid was born in Cootehill, County Cavan, on 28 July 1895, to Eugene McQuaid and Jennie Corry. His mother died very soon after his birth. His father remarried and McQuaid's new wife raised John and his sister Helen as her own. It was not until his teenage years that John learned that his biological mother had died.

McQuaid first attended Cootehill National School, the headmaster of which considered him to be an outstanding pupil. Thereafter, he attended St. Patrick's College in Cavan Town and then Blackrock College in Dublin, run by the Holy Ghost Fathers.  In 1911, he entered Clongowes Wood Jesuit College in County Kildare with his brother Eugene. 

In 1913, on completion of his secondary education, McQuaid entered the novitiate of the Holy Ghost Fathers in Kimmage, Dublin.  The celebrations of the centenary of the birth of Thomas Davis, a well-known Protestant nationalist, occurred in that year; McQuaid referred at that time in his notebook to Davis's famous question: "What matter that at different shrines, we pray unto one God?"  He noted: "Yes for a logical Protestant but No for Catholics. We must heed what is in the creed. ... If a neutral nationality be set up, if Protestants are drawn in and not converted, is not the supernatural end missed?"

While serving his novitiate, McQuaid studied at University College, Dublin, where he was awarded a first class honours BA in 1917 and MA in Ancient Classics in 1918. He was also awarded an honours Higher Diploma in Education in 1919, while acting as prefect in Blackrock College.

McQuaid was ordained a priest on 29 June 1924.  He attended the Gregorian University in Rome, where he completed a doctorate in theology.

Dean and President of Blackrock College, 1925–1939
While he was being trained as a novice and then as a priest, McQuaid's great ambition was to become a missionary to Africa. John Horgan says that: 

In November 1925, McQuaid was appointed to the staff at Blackrock College in Dublin where he remained until 1939. He served as dean of studies from 1925 to 1931 and president of the college from 1931 to 1939.

At Blackrock, McQuaid soon made his name as an administrator and as a headmaster with detailed knowledge of educational developments in other countries and with wide cultural views. In 1929 he was appointed special delegate on the Department of Education's Commission of Enquiry into the teaching of English; in 1930 he was the official delegate of the Catholic Headmasters' Association at the first International Congress of Free Secondary Education held in Brussels; he was present in the same capacity at later Congresses in The Hague, Luxembourg and Fribourg. Elected chairman of the Catholic Headmasters' Association in 1931, he remained in the chair until 1940, being specially co-opted to it in the autumn of 1939 on his ceasing to be President of Blackrock.

International Eucharistic Congress 1932

The 31st International Eucharistic Congress was held in Dublin over five days in June 1932. This was a major gathering, involving many people and events that included a large garden party organised by McQuaid in the grounds of Blackrock College, attended by many clerics and laypeople. Among the attendees were James McNeill and Éamon de Valera, which demonstrated McQuaid's courtesy and diplomacy to considerable political effect. Historian Dermot Keogh says that 

However, in a breach of protocol, McNeill, who was the Governor-General of the Irish Free State, was not invited to the lavish state reception in Dublin Castle later that day to welcome the Papal Legate. Given such treatment it was hardly surprising that the situation came to a head later in 1932. King George V engineered a compromise, whereby de Valera withdrew his dismissal request and McNeill, who was due to retire at the end of 1932, would push forward his retirement date by a month or so. McNeill, at the King's request, resigned on 1 November 1932.

Involvement in drafting the Constitution
McQuaid's Holy Ghost confrère, Father Michael O'Carroll, wrote in 1998 that de Valera entered McQuaid's life at about the time the latter became president of Blackrock College in 1931: 

In 1937, the new Irish Constitution was adopted which, inter alia, acknowledged the "special position" of the Catholic Church "as the guardian of the Faith professed by the great majority of the citizens." It also forbade any established state church and encouraged freedom of religion.

Chapter 8 of John Cooney's John Charles McQuaid, Ruler of Catholic Ireland is entitled "Co-maker of the Constitution" and begins:

Historian Dermot Keogh has criticised Cooney's interpretation:

Appointment as Archbishop
McQuaid's appointment in 1940 to the Archdiocese of Dublin, the second most important and populous in the country, came at a more stable point in Irish politics, following the violence involving the Irish Republican Army (1922–1969)IRA and the Blueshirts and the tensions caused by the Economic War with the UK in the 1930s. The beginning of "the Emergency" (Ireland's term for the Second World War), had produced a new mode of national consensus. Also McQuaid's relations with the Taoiseach, Éamon de Valera, were at that time excellent in contrast to most of the hierarchy who were distinctly cool towards him.  de Valera later said that he had been impressed by McQuaid's social concerns at a time when the hardships of the war were particularly affecting the poor. The hierarchy and clergy of the Irish Church reflected the views of the strong and middling farmer class from which they were mostly drawn and were uncomprehending of urban life and poverty. McQuaid, as de Valera knew, was different and this was reflected in his first Lenten pastoral in 1941. "The very widespread yearning for social peace is itself proof of the grave need of social reform", McQuaid wrote. But he emphasised that "whatever shape the detailed reform of the social structure ultimately may take, the only lasting basis of reconstruction can be the true faith that we profess."

David C. Sheehy, Dublin diocesan archivist, wrote in 2003 that McQuaid, whom he describes as being a prima donna, "saw the achievement of high office as the natural and appropriate outcome for someone of his background, education and talents."

Archbishop of Dublin, 1940–1971

On 6 November 1940, when aged 45, McQuaid was appointed Archbishop of Dublin. He took as his episcopal motto the phrase  from John 18:37 - "to bear witness to the truth".

McQuaid oversaw a massive expansion of the Catholic Church in the Archdiocese of Dublin during his term, during which the number of Catholics grew from around 630,000  to more than 800,000. The number of clergy rose from 370 to 600 and an additional 60 parishes were created, along with 80 new churches, 100 new secondary schools and 250 new primary schools.

McQuaid also established a wide range of social services for the poor of the city and did much work relating to charity. In his first year in office, he oversaw the establishment of the Catholic Social Welfare Conference to co-ordinate the work of the many charitable organisations in the city. Then, in the following year, he set up the Catholic Social Welfare Bureau, which helped emigrants and their families.

Historian Dermot Keogh has written of the effect of McQuaid's work as archbishop on his own life as a schoolboy: 

This record of expansion had one curious side effect. Dublin has two Protestant cathedrals largely built in the Middle Ages but no Catholic cathedral. The centre of the Catholic Archdiocese is the early 19th century St Mary's Pro-Cathedral on Marlborough Street, a side street in the city centre. The Pro-Cathedral was never intended to be other than a temporary acting cathedral, pending the availability of funds to build a full cathedral. (In the aftermath of the 1921 Treaty, the Church of Ireland offered to return either St.Patrick's Cathedral or Christ Church to the Roman Catholic Church in Ireland: they refused the offer). McQuaid bought the gardens in the centre of Merrion Square and announced plans to erect a cathedral there. However, he felt obliged to use the funds originally designated for the new cathedral to build the new churches and schools instead. His successor eventually handed over the gardens to Dublin Corporation and they are now a public park. As a result of the Archbishop's sense of priorities, Dublin still has no Catholic cathedral.

McQuaid also controversially extended the ban on Catholics attending Trinity College Dublin. Originally Catholics had objected to being excluded from the university from 1695 until the Irish Roman Catholic Relief Act 1793 was passed. In the ensuing century Trinity came to be seen as a dangerous bastion of Protestant influence in Ireland. Exemptions were granted to businessmen such as Al Byrne (in 1948), provided that they did not join any college societies. The general prohibition was lifted by bishops meeting at Maynooth in June 1970, towards the end of McQuaid's episcopacy.

Finally, in 1961 McQuaid founded the Colleges' Volunteer Corps, drawn from Roman Catholic secondary colleges in Dublin, which carried out social work.  It also served as an honour guard when he visited Lourdes and on other occasions. Restricted to male students during his lifetime, it was opened to female students by his successors.

In the 1950s, McQuaid ordered the purchase of Ashurst, a Victorian neo-Gothic mansion on Military Road in Killiney, an upmarket suburb in south County Dublin. The house had been built in the 1860s. He renamed the mansion Notre Dame de Bois, and it became his chief residence thereafter, as he preferred it to Archbishop's House, the official episcopal palace in Drumcondra.

Politician
There was a friendship between McQuaid and de Valera, founder of the Fianna Fáil party and frequent head of government from the 1930s to the late 1950s, but this did not prevent disagreements, especially after McQuaid became archbishop. While de Valera put the interests of the State first,  McQuaid promoted those of the Church.

In 1946 McQuaid's support of the national teachers' strike, greatly annoyed de Valera. In 1951 the Fianna Fáil government (which replaced the First Inter-Party Government) introduced a revised version of Noel Browne's original Mother and Child Scheme to which the hierarchy, led by McQuaid had successfully objected. Although the Archbishop still objected to the modified version, he was out-manoeuvered by de Valera.

In 1952 McQuaid writing to the Apostolic Nuncio, complained "From Mr de Valera's re-assumption of political leadership, the chief element of note, as far as the church is concerned, is a policy of distance. That policy is seen in the failure to consult any Bishop ..."

Personal qualities
Behind his formidable exterior, McQuaid was an extremely shy man who was ill at ease at social functions. In 1963 after the first session of the Second Vatican Council, he set up a secret all-priests Public Image Committee "to examine what is now called the public image of the Church in the Dublin Diocese". The Archbishop insisted that the committee members should pull no punches and they obliged. The committee reported that his public image "is entirely negative: a man who forbids, a man who is stern and aloof from the lives of the people, a man who doesn't meet the people (as they want him to) at church functions, at public gatherings, or television or in the streets, who writes deep pastoral letters in theological and canonical language that is remote from the lives of the people". One of the committee members noted that the archbishop was "somewhat disappointed" after the first meeting. "He felt the discussion centred too much on him personally. The image of the church was not the same as that of the archbishop."

Relationship to Patrick Kavanagh
McQuaid regularly gave money to the poet Patrick Kavanagh, whom he first met in 1940. In 1946 he found Kavanagh a job on the Catholic magazine The Standard but the poet remained chronically disorganised and the archbishop continued to assist him until his death. Kavanagh was a notable religious poet but his long poem "The Great Hunger" (1942) gave a very bleak view of Catholicism.

Journalist Emmanuel Kehoe wrote of Kavanagh's "The Great Hunger": 

On Kavanagh's death in 1967, McQuaid told his widow that prior to their marriage he had arranged for her husband to be cared for at a private nursing home when necessary but that it was "not God's will".

Antisemitism 
In 1932, McQuaid then president of Blackrock College, gave a sermon in his native Cavan on Passion Sunday in which he denounced Jews on the grounds that "From the first persecutions till the present moment, you will find Jews engaged in practically every movement against Our Divine Lord and His Church. A Jew as a Jew is utterly opposed to Jesus Christ and all the Church means....by Satan we mean not only Lucifer and the fallen Angels, but also those men, Jews and others, who...have chosen Satan for their head." He the went on to assert that the international press and Hollywood were controlled by the "Jew-enemy of our Saviour," that the Great Depression was "the deliberate work of a few Jew financiers," and that this and other schemes were all part of a larger plot to bring the world under the control of the "Jew-controlled League of Nations." In May 1949, McQuaid wrote to Chief Rabbi Immanuel Jakobovits to threaten the Jewish community in Ireland if the new state of Israel did not address Christian places of worship there to McQuaid's satisfaction; in his report on the matter to the Apostolic Nuncio, McQuaid asserted the morality of using as a weapon "that which most worries a Jew: the fear of reprisals."

Social issues

National Teachers' Strike, 1946
The seven-month strike by the Irish National Teachers Organisation in 1946 strained the relationship between McQuaid and de Valera, who was Taoiseach at the time. Primary school teachers wanted a wage increase and parity with their secondary school colleagues. As former teachers (and de Valera had also been Minister for Education in 1939/40), both men had a very high opinion of the teaching profession but the Government was facing severe financial constraints. De Valera acknowledged the national teachers' great responsibilities, but was not only unwilling to grant them parity with secondary teachers, but refused to meet their more modest pay demands. McQuaid eventually realised that his support for the teachers would not overcome de Valera's objections and he then persuaded them to end their strike.

Italian communism, 1947–1948
McQuaid organised funds for post-war relief in various European countries, and notably for Italy. He also attempted to rally Irish public opinion to join in his, shared by the Irish government, regarding the spread of Communism in European countries. Aside from sending clothing, footwear and food, for which he arranged that shipping costs would be borne by the Irish government, he sent £20,000 for use against Communists in the 1948 Italian general election.

Mother and Child Scheme, 1950–1951
In the early 1950s, Noel Browne, the First Inter-Party Government's Minister of Health, – shocked by the absence of ante-natal care for pregnant women, and the resulting infant mortality rates in Ireland – proposed providing free access to health care for mothers and children in a new Mother and Child Scheme. The government of the time sought approval from the Catholic Church in relation to the scheme. McQuaid strongly criticised the scheme, claiming it was against the "moral teaching" of the Catholic Church. This criticism by McQuaid, in the context of his strong personal political influence, and that of the Catholic Church, resulted in the government withdrawing the scheme, and the resignation of Browne. Browne's resignation ignited a controversy as he passed on correspondence between the Bishop's house and his own department to the editor of the Irish Times, R. M. "Bertie" Smyllie. The letters revealed that McQuaid and the Church held what some would deem an inappropriate level of sway over the Irish government. This controversy sparked a debate amongst the Irish people about the relationship between the church and the state.

Yugoslavian football match boycotts, 1952–1955
In the 1950s Yugoslavia was run by the League of Communists of Yugoslavia. Its courts had sent Cardinal Stepinac to prison for collaborating with the fascist Ustaše during the Second World War and he was released in 1951. The Catholic Church felt that it was still being discriminated against by the regime. McQuaid persuaded the Football Association of Ireland to cancel a match between Yugoslavia and the Republic of Ireland in 1952. He then unsuccessfully called for a boycott when a similar match was arranged for October 1955. McQuaid did however persuade the radio broadcaster Philip Greene not to commentate the match, which led to the memorable newspaper headline: "Reds turn Greene Yellow".

Second Vatican Council, 1962–1965
McQuaid's conservatism made acceptance of the Second Vatican Council difficult for him but he did, nonetheless, try to introduce the necessary changes because of his loyalty to the church. His slowness in doing so, however, upset some among the laity: he dragged his feet in particular with regard to the requirements for ecumenism, greater lay participation and upheavals relating to liturgy. He also criticised what he considered to be "facile ignorance" in reporting of the Council's events by Irish journalists, and their still "more facile dictation in regards to what we bishops must do now". He attempted to reassure his congregation that none of the changes would impact on the "tranquility" of their lives.

As was standard practice for the church, McQuaid offered to resign on his 75th birthday. He was very upset that the Pope accepted this, albeit with a year's extension. Francis Carty writes, "He was possibly worried that the Pope's rapid acceptance of his resignation was a negative judgement on his work".

McQuaid resigned his post on 4 January 1971 and formally relinquished the government of the Archdiocese of Dublin when his successor, Dermot Ryan, was ordained Archbishop on 13 February 1972.

RTE's Radharc programme
In response to the challenge of Vatican II, the Irish Church modernised its structures to some extent. The Catholic Communications Institute of Ireland under Father Joseph Dunn was founded. Radharc ("view" or "vision" in the Irish language), directed by Dunn, was to become one of the national broadcaster RTÉ's longest running documentary programmes. Dunn was supported by various priests of the Dublin Archdiocese and addresses a variety of topics including the first film shot in an Irish prison, The Young Offender (1963). Radharc made films about devotional topics but Dunn laid emphasis on the social gospel with films like Honesty at the Fair (1963), Down and Out in Dublin (1964), The Boat Train to Euston (1965) and Smuggling and Smugglers (1965).

Allegations of child abuse

In his biography of McQuaid, John Cooney relates a number of stories that suggest that McQuaid had a sexual interest in children. The main allegation – that the Archbishop had attempted to sexually assault a boy in a Dublin pub – is based on an unpublished essay by Noel Browne. Reviewers who praised the biography stated that the author should have left out these allegations (Dermot Keogh and John A. Murphy, Emeritus Professor of History at University College, Cork).

There is an account by Colum Kenny, Associate Professor of Communications at Dublin City University, of a meeting he had with the Archbishop as a teenager in the 1960s. Although his attitude to McQuaid is hostile, he regards Cooney's allegations as absurd. He also notes: 

Two separate allegations of paedophile abuse by McQuaid were brought to the attention of the Murphy Commission. One complaint alleges abuse of a 12-year-old boy by McQuaid in 1961. The complaint concerned an adult who, in January 2003, complained to the Eastern Health Board that he had been abused by McQuaid 42 years previously. The EHB and its successor, the Health Service Executive (HSE), have responsibility for caring for minors (under 18) who have been sexually abused and it is not clear where their duty lies in relation to adults accusing deceased persons. When this complaint came to light several years later, the HSE did not pass this complaint on to the Murphy Commission – again for unexplained reasons – but the Commission is satisfied that this was simply due to human error. In May 2009, the HSE passed the complaint to the then Director of Child Protection in the Dublin Archdiocese, who informed Archbishop Diarmuid Martin, who immediately informed the Murphy Commission.

The archdiocese then organised a further trawl of its files and found a letter "which showed that there was an awareness among a number of people in the archdiocese that there had been a concern expressed" about McQuaid in 1999.

Then in 2010, after the commission's report had been published, Martin told it he had received another abuse complaint against McQuaid. The supplementary report of the Commission said "Archbishop Martin was under no obligation to give the commission this information". It was now a matter for the archdiocese "to investigate all complaints against this cleric," it said. The 2010 complaint is the subject of a civil action against the archdiocese.

Meanwhile, John Cooney also called on Desmond Connell to apologise unreservedly for dismissing claims that McQuaid had improper sexual relations with boys. (Connell was Archbishop of Dublin when Cooney's book was published in 1999 and described his claims of sex abuse as "rumour, hearsay and conjecture".) A statement from Cooney said: "It inflicted huge moral and material damage on me as an author and journalist. I would expect Cardinal Connell to offer me, and my publisher, the O'Brien Press, this long overdue apology."

Martin Sixsmith in The Lost Child of Philomena Lee recounts the content of the letter from unnamed boy mentioned above from Noel Browne and claims it was used to eliminate McQuaid's alleged opposition to a government Adoption Act to remove control over adoption of extra-marital children from the Catholic Church and vest it in the government.

Handling of allegations of abuse against clergy

In 2009, the Murphy Commission of Investigation produced its "Report into the Catholic Archdiocese of Dublin". The purpose of the commission was to probe the manner in which complaints of clerical abuse were handled.

A first complaint about Father James McNamee bathing with naked adolescent boys at Stella Maris F.C. was made in January 1960, investigated initially by Auxiliary Bishop Patrick Dunne and reported to McQuaid. McNamee denied the allegations and was believed by the bishops. McQuaid wrote: "as he is a worthy priest I agree that we could not refuse to accept his word." McNamee moved on from the club but, McQuaid said, not immediately "lest he be defamed." Many subsequent complaints were made about McNamee.

In August 1960, a British photographic processing company passed on film posted to them from Father Edmondus [a pseudonym for Father Paul McGennis] in Dublin to Scotland Yard. The photographs were of girls' private parts. It was passed to the Commissioner of the Garda Síochána, who asked McQuaid to take over the investigation. He in turn passed it to Bishop Dunne, who had grave concerns that a canonical crime had been committed. McGennis admitted to McQuaid that he had taken pictures of children at Crumlin Hospital, because of ignorance and curiosity regarding female sex organs. He related his social discomfiture with females as he was raised with brothers (in fact he had a sister). McQuaid and Dunne finally agreed that a canonical crime had not been committed. McQuaid arranged for McGennis to see a doctor for instruction "to end his wonderment" at female genitalia. The Commission believed that "Archbishop McQuaid acted as he did to avoid scandal in both Ireland and Rome and without regard to the protection of children in Crumlin Hospital." It described his usage of the word "wonderment" to describe McGennis' actions as "risible." It further added, "The apparent cancellation by Archbishop McQuaid of his original plan to pursue the priest through the procedures of canon law was a disaster. It established a pattern of not holding abusers responsible which lasted for decades ... no attempt was made to monitor Fr. Edmondus in other placements."

In 1961, McQuaid established a hostel in Dublin for boys who had been in industrial schools – mainly Artane – and assigned priests to see to their spiritual welfare and to help them integrate into society. One of these priests was Diarmuid Martin who went on to become Archbishop of Dublin in 2004 and to take a strong line against alleged clerical abusers. In June 2009, John Cooney wrote an article in the Irish Independent demanding to know why Martin had not denounced the alleged horrors of Artane 40 years previously. Patsy McGarry, Religious Affairs correspondent of The Irish Times, also wrote an article entitled "Archbishop Defends Abuse Inaction", in which Martin was quoted as saying

Death and legacy
On 7 April 1973, McQuaid was too ill to get up at his usual time of 6.30am to say Mass at his private residence, Notre Dame de Bois. He was taken to Loughlinstown Hospital where he died within an hour. Shortly before his death he asked a nurse if he had any chance of reaching heaven. She told him that if he as Archbishop could not get to heaven, few would. This answer appeared to satisfy him and he lay back on the pillow to await death. He died at about 11am. He is buried in St. Mary's Pro-Cathedral in Dublin, the seat of the Roman Catholic Archdiocese.

In his book Twentieth Century Ireland, published in 2005, Dermot Keogh writes: 

In an article in The Irish Times on 7 April 2003, McQuaid's biographer, John Cooney, provided a different slant to the observations of Keogh:

Notes

Further reading
 John Feeney: John Charles McQuaid: The Man and the Mask (Dublin: Mercier Press 1974)
 Noel Browne: Against the Tide, (Gill & Macmillan, 1986 
 Bernard J Canning: Bishops of Ireland 1870–1987, Ballyshannon [Ireland] : Donegal Democrat, 1987
 Patrick J. Corish: The Irish Catholic Experience: A Historical Survey, Dublin: Gill and Macmillan, 1985
 Joe Dunn: No Tigers in Africa, Dublin: Columba Press, 1986
 Joe Dunn: No Lions in the Hierarchy: an anthology of sorts, Dublin: Columba Press, 1994
 John Whyte: Church and State in Modern Ireland 1923–1979, Dublin: Gill and Macmillan; Totowa, N.J. : Barnes & Noble Books, 2nd ed 1980
 John Horgan: Noel Browne Passionate Outsider, Gill and Macmillan, 2000
 Clara Cullen and Margaret Ó hÓgartaigh: His Grace is Displeased: The Selected Correspondence of John Charles McQuaid, Roman Catholic Archbishop of Dublin, 1940-1972, Merrion Press, 2012

External links
 Contraception and Conscience, Archbishop McQuaid's pastorals on contraception

1895 births
1973 deaths
20th-century Roman Catholic archbishops in Ireland
Alumni of University College Dublin
Conservatism in Ireland
Holy Ghost Fathers
Irish anti-communists
Irish anti-contraception activists
Irish constitutional law
Participants in the Second Vatican Council
People educated at Blackrock College
People educated at Clongowes Wood College
People educated at St Patrick's College, Cavan
People from County Cavan
Presidents of Blackrock College
Roman Catholic archbishops of Dublin